The Rio Puerco Bridge is a Parker through truss bridge located on historic U.S. Route 66 (US 66) in western Bernalillo County, New Mexico, United States, that is listed on the New Mexico State Register of Cultural Properties and the National Register of Historic Places (NRHP).

Description

The bridge crosses the Rio Puerco and was built in 1933.

It was built to carry a past alignment of US 66 over the Rio Puerco, and in 1997 carried a frontage road for Interstate 40 (I-40). It no longer carries traffic, and has been bypassed by a different frontage road bridge.

The single-span Parker through truss steel bridge was fabricated by the Kansas City Structural Steel Company and built by F.D. Shufflebarger in 1933. Its substructure includes two concrete piers and massive concrete abutments set upon timber pilings.

The bridge was added to the NRHP July 15, 1997.

See also

 National Register of Historic Places listings in Bernalillo County, New Mexico

References

External links

Road bridges on the National Register of Historic Places in New Mexico
Bridges on U.S. Route 66
Buildings and structures in Bernalillo County, New Mexico
Transportation in Bernalillo County, New Mexico
U.S. Route 66 in New Mexico
National Register of Historic Places in Bernalillo County, New Mexico
Parker truss bridges in the United States
New Mexico State Register of Cultural Properties